Anna Maria Ferrero (18 February 1935 – 21 May 2018) was an Italian actress.

Early life and career
Born Anna Maria Guerra, she changed her last name to Ferrero in honor of the composer Willy Ferrero. Her film debut came at the age of 15 in Il cielo è rosso (1950), and she was soon cast in such films as  Il duca di Sant'Elmo (1950) and Il Cristo proibito (1951), the only movie directed by the noted writer Curzio Malaparte.

Later career
Ferrero's career progressed quickly as she worked with prominent directors, such as Michelangelo Antonioni on I vinti, and actors, like Marcello Mastroianni in Carlo Lizzani's award-winning Chronicle of Poor Lovers (1953). She appeared with the popular comedian Totò in Totò e Carolina (1953) and with star Alberto Sordi in Una parigina a Roma (1954).

She appeared with Vittorio Gassman in six films: Lorenzaccio, King Vidor's  War and Peace, Kean, which Gassman co-directed, Giovanni dalle bande nere, Le sorprese dell'amore, and Il mattatore.

Her last on-screen appearance was in an episode of the movie Controsesso (1964), directed by  Ettore Scola.

Personal life
Ferrero chose to end her career shortly after her 1963 marriage to French actor Jean Sorel, her co-star in two films: Gold of Rome (1961) and Four Days in Naples (1962).

Filmography

 The Sky Is Red (Il Cielo è rosso) (1950) .... Giulia
 Tomorrow Is Another Day (1951) .... Giulia
 The Forbidden Christ (Il Cristo proibito) (1951) .... Maria
 Lorenzaccio (1951) .... Luisa Strozzi
 The Temptress (Le due verità) (1952) .... Maria-Luce Carlinet
 Finishing School (Fanciulle di lusso) (1953) .... Valerie De Beranger
 Ragazze da marito (1952) .... Anna Maria Mazzillo
 Poppy (Lo sai che i papaveri) (1952) .... Pierina Zacchi
 The Mute of Portici (La Muta di Portici) (1952) .... (uncredited)
 Half a Century of Song (Canzoni di mezzo secolo) (1952)
 The Unfaithfuls (Le infedeli) (1953) .... Cesarina
 Siamo tutti inquilini (1953) .... Anna Perrini
 Eager to Live (Febbre di vivere) (1953) .... Elena
 Youth and Perversion (I vinti) (1953) .... Marina
 Neapolitans in Milan (Napoletani a Milano) (1953) .... Nannina
 Captain Phantom (Capitan Fantasma) (1953) .... (uncredited)
 It Happened in the Park (1953) .... Anna Maria Del Balzo (segment: Pi-greco)
 Verdi, the King of Melody (Giuseppe Verdi) (1953) .... Margherita Barezzi Verdi
 Viva la rivista! (1953)
 The Count of Saint Elmo (il Conte di Sant'Elmo) (1953) .... Laura Cassano
 Chronicle of Poor Lovers (Cronache di poveri amanti) (1954) .... Gesuina
 Guai ai vinti (1954) .... Clara
 A Parisian in Rome (1954) .... Fiorella
 Toto and Carolina (Totò e Carolina) (1955) .... Carolina De Vico
 The Widow (La vedova X) (1955) .... Adriana
 The golden falcon (Il falco d'oro) (1955) .... Fiammetta
 Songs of Italy (1955)
 War and Peace (1956) .... Mary Bolkonsky
 The Violent Patriot (Giovanni dalle bande nere) (1956) .... Anna, peasant girl
 The Rival (La rivale) (1955) .... Barbara Candi
 Supreme Confession (Suprema confessione) (1956) .... Giovanna Siri
 Cime tempestose (1956, TV Mini-Series) .... Catherina
 Kean: Genius or Scoundrel (Kean) (1956) .... Anna Damby
 Desert Warrior (Los amantes del desierto) (1957) .... (uncredited)
 Captain Falcon (Capitan Fuoco) (1958) .... Anna
 Questa mia donna (1958, TV Movie) .... Maria Luisa
 Bad Girls Don't Cry (la notte brava) (1959) .... Nicoletta
 Surprise of Love (Le sorprese dell'amore) (1959) .... Mariarosa
 The Employee (L'impiegato) (1960) .... Joan
 Gastone (1960) .... Nannina
 Love and Larceny (il mattatore) (1960) .... Annalisa Rauseo
 Austerlitz (Austerlitz) (1960) .... Elisa Bonaparte
 Culpables (1960) .... Margarita
 Silver Spoon Set (I delfini) (1960) .... Marina Castelfranco
 The Hunchback of Rome (Il gobbo) (1960) .... Ninetta
 Captain Fracasse (Le Capitaine Fracasse) (1961) .... Marquise des Bruyères 
 A Day for Lionhearts (Un giorno da leoni) (1961) .... Ida
 Gold of Rome (L'oro di Roma) (1961) .... Giulia
 Always on Sunday (Una domenica d'estate) (1962) .... Milena
 The Four Days of Naples (Le quattro giornate di Napoli) (1962) .... (uncredited)
 Un marito in condominio (1963) .... Giuliana
 Countersex (Controsesso) (1964) .... Marcella (segment "Cocaina di domenica") (final film role)

References

External links 

 
 

1935 births
2018 deaths
Italian film actresses
Actresses from Rome
20th-century Italian actresses